Alyaksey Tsimashenka (born 9 December 1986) is a Belarusian professional footballer who plays for Lokomotiv Gomel.

Honours
Gomel
Belarusian Cup winner: 2010–11
Belarusian Super Cup winner: 2012

External links

1986 births
Living people
Belarusian footballers
Association football defenders
FC Gomel players
FC Rechitsa-2014 players
FC Belshina Bobruisk players
FC Slavia Mozyr players
FC Granit Mikashevichi players
FC Shakhtyor Soligorsk players
FC Vitebsk players
FC Slutsk players
FC Sputnik Rechitsa players
FC Lokomotiv Gomel players